Suan Luang is one of the 50 districts (khet) of Bangkok, Thailand. It is bounded by other Bangkok districts (from north clockwise): Bang Kapi, Saphan Sung, Prawet, Phra Khanong, and Watthana.

History
Suan Luang was a sub-district of Phra Khanong District. When Phra Khanong district was split into smaller districts on 9 November 1989, Suan Luang became part of the new Prawet District. On 14 January 1994 (following its announcement on 8 October 1993) Suan Luang was elevated to a district, merging the area once belonging to Suan Luang Sub-district with additional land from Prawet and Khlong Toei. Suan Luang Sub-district remained the only sub-district until 2017, when the two new sub-districts of On Nut and Phatthanakan were created.

Administration
The district has three sub-districts (khwaeng).

Places

 Wat Maha But is well known for its Mae Nak shrine. Numerous works of fiction and films including Nang Nak were influenced by Mae Nak.

Education

St. Mark's International School Bangkok is in the district.
Thai-Nichi Institute of Technology
Triam Udom Suksa Pattanakarn School

References

External links

 Suan Luang district office (Thai only)
 Planning Department maps of Suan Luang District

 
Districts of Bangkok